The 2009 Kvalserien was the 35th Kvalserien qualification for Elitserien, played between 13 March and 9 April 2009.

The 2009 Kvalserien included six teams. In this year's Kvalserien, Södertälje and Rögle, who both came from Elitserien, qualified for the 2009–10 Elitserien season. It was the first time since 2003 that both teams from Elitserien managed to stay in Elitserien via Kvalserien. AIK made their first Kvalserien qualification for Elitserien since 2004. Växjö Lakers made their first Kvalserien qualification for Elitserien in the club's history. Södertälje won the 2009 Kvalserien, ending at 22 points, followed by Rögle who got 19 points. AIK finished at third place and thus missed promotion to Elitserien, ending at 16 points, 3 points behind Rögle. Leksand missed Elitserien for the fourth consecutive year, ending at 14 points. Växjö Lakers ended at fifth place with 10 points, and Västerås finished last with 9 points.

Standings

Game log 

|-
| rowspan="3" | 1 || rowspan="3" | 13 March || Växjö Lakers HC || 3–4 (SO) || Rögle BK || Växjö Ishall || 3,154
|-
| AIK IF || 3–4 (OT) || VIK Västerås HK || Hovet || 6,104
|-
| Leksands IF || 2–3 || Södertälje SK || Ejendals Arena || 7,650
|-
| rowspan="3" | 2 || rowspan="3" | 15 March || VIK Västerås HK || 3–1 || Växjö Lakers HC || ABB Arena || 3,006
|-
| Södertälje SK || 3–1 || AIK IF || AXA Sports Center || 6,120
|-
| Rögle BK || 4–2 || Leksands IF || Lindab Arena || 5,100
|-
| rowspan="3" | 3 || rowspan="3" | 18 March || Växjö Lakers HC || 3–5 || Södertälje SK || Växjö Ishall || 2,401
|-
| AIK IF || 5–1 || Leksands IF || Hovet || 7,689
|-
| VIK Västerås HK || 1–6 || Rögle BK || ABB Arena || 4,919
|-
| rowspan="3" | 4 || rowspan="3" | 22 March || Leksands IF || 2–3 || Växjö Lakers HC || Ejendals Arena || 6,682
|-
| Södertälje SK || 4–3 (OT) || VIK Västerås HK || AXA Sports Center || 4,281
|-
| Rögle BK || 5–1 || AIK IF || Lindab Arena || 4,587
|-
| rowspan="3" | 5 || rowspan="3" | 24 March || Växjö Lakers HC || 7–3 || AIK IF || Växjö Ishall || 2,402
|-
| Södertälje SK || 2–4 || Rögle BK || AXA Sports Center || 3,701
|-
| VIK Västerås HK || 2–4 || Leksands IF || ABB Arena || 5,148
|-
| rowspan="3" | 6 || rowspan="3" | 27 March || AIK IF || 2–0 || Växjö Lakers HC || Hovet || 2,845
|-
| Leksands IF || 5–3 || VIK Västerås HK || Ejendals Arena || 7,076
|-
| Rögle BK || 3–2 (SO) || Södertälje SK || Lindab Arena || 5,043
|-
| rowspan="3" | 7 || rowspan="3" | 30 March || Växjö Lakers HC || 2–4 || Leksands IF || Växjö Ishall || 3,026
|-
| AIK IF || 3–1 || Rögle BK || Hovet || 4,174
|-
| VIK Västerås HK || 1–4 || Södertälje SK || ABB Arena || 3,205
|-

|-
| rowspan="3" | 8 || rowspan="3" | 2 April || Leksands IF || 1–2 || AIK IF || Ejendals Arena || 7,430
|-
| Södertälje SK || 5–1 || Växjö Lakers HC || AXA Sports Center || 3,260
|-
| Rögle BK || 4–3 || VIK Västerås HK || Lindab Arena || 4,979
|-
| rowspan="3" | 9 || rowspan="3" | 6 April || Växjö Lakers HC || 3–4 || VIK Västerås HK || Växjö Ishall || 2,216
|-
| AIK IF || 2–6 || Södertälje SK || Hovet || 6,352
|-
| Leksands IF || 4–2 || Rögle BK || Ejendals Arena || 5,751
|-
| rowspan="3" | 10 || rowspan="3" | 9 April || Södertälje SK || 5–6 (SO) || Leksands IF || AXA Sports Center || 5,124
|-
| VIK Västerås HK || 5–6 || AIK IF || ABB Arena || 1,750
|-
| Rögle BK || 3–5 || Växjö Lakers HC || Lindab Arena || 5,100
|-

Kvalserien
Kvalserien